Syed Kamal Udin Safavi (Born in 1936 and died on September 13, 1989 in Karachi, Sindh, Pakistan), better known as Kamal Irani, was an actor of Pakistani cinema (Lollywood). He worked in 244 Urdu, Punjabi, Pashto, and Sindhi films.

Films
 Chiragh Jalta Raha (1962)
 Bees Din (1964)
 Heera Aur Pathar (1964)
 Tauba (1964)
 Aina (1966) (as K. Irani)
 Hum Dono (1966)
 Jaag Utha Insan (1966)
 Afsana (1970)
 Baharon Phool Barsao (1972)
 Aik Gunnah Aur Sahi (1975)
 Sohni Mahiwal (1976)

See also 
 List of Lollywood actors

References

External links

Mazhar.dk Kamal Irani Debut

Pakistani male film actors
Year of birth missing
1989 deaths
Male actors from Karachi